The SS Vadala was a  steamship with a length of , breadth of , and draught of . She was built by William Denny and Company, Dumbarton, for the British-India Steam Navigation Company (B.I.S.N.) in 1890. She had quadruple expansion, 315 nhp, steam engines. She was one of the early B.I.S.N. ships to use telemotor steering gear.

Vadala was a passenger cargo vessel, also used for the transportation of Indian indentured labourers to the colonies. On 26 March 1895 she arrived in Fiji with 747 indentured Indian labourers on board. During the trip, the ship rolled violently and the Surgeon-Superintendent complained about his patients being thrown about below deck.

In 1913 she was sold to Inui Gomei Kaisha of Japan and renamed, Kenkon Maru No. 12.

See also 
 Indian Indenture Ships to Fiji
 Indian indenture system

References

External links 
 
 

Ships of the British India Steam Navigation Company
Indian indenture ships to Fiji
Victorian-era passenger ships of the United Kingdom
Shipwrecks in the Pacific Ocean
Maritime incidents in 1928
1890 ships